Paul Martin (born 12 October 1982) is a South African water polo coach. He was the head coach of the South Africa men's national water polo team at the 2020 Summer Olympics.

References

External links
 

1982 births
Living people
South African male water polo players
South African water polo coaches
South Africa men's national water polo team coaches
Water polo coaches at the 2020 Summer Olympics